The Church of Jesus Christ of Latter-day Saints in Romania refers to the Church of Jesus Christ of Latter-day Saints (LDS Church) and its members in Romania. A small branch was formed in Bucharest in 1991. In 2021, there were 3,087 members in 15 congregations.

History 

In 1841, on a trip to Palestine, Elder Orson Hyde, a member of the Quorum of the Twelve, traveled along Danube River between Vienna, Austria, and Galati, now Galai, Romania.

In 1899, Latter-day Saint missionary Mischa Markow preached in Bucharest where several joined the Church. He was jailed for preaching and later banished from the city. He then traveled to additional cities, such as Timişoara and Braşov, where branches were organized. In January 1904, Hugh J. Cannon, president of the German Mission, created the Austro-Hungarian Conference, which included the branches in Temesvar, Brasso, and Vienna, Austria. Members met for several decades following his initial proselytism efforts. Between 1903 and 1913, Brasov had thirty convert baptisms, and forty-eight missionaries served in the city. On March 5, 1913 the conference was closed and missionaries were removed from the area. Some contact was made to members between World War I and prior to the star of World War II, but missionary work would not resume until 1990.

In October 1987, Elder Russell M. Nelson of the Quorum of the Twelve and Elder Hans B. Ringger of the seventy visited Bucharest to talk with government officials about the potential of sending humanitarian missionaries in Romania. They returned again in 1990 to make plans for humanitarian relief. While there, the group visited Cismigiu Park, where Elder Nelson blessed and dedicated the country. The first eight humanitarian missionaries arrived on September 2, 1990. The first proselyting missionaries were young male missionaries that arrived in December 1990. The first Female proselyting missionaries arrived October 1991.

Romania's first branch was organized on July 28, 1991 in Bucharest with Octavian Vasilescu as president and the branch was divided on July 28, 1991. Another branch was organized in Ploiesti on February 15, 1993. The Church obtained missionary visas and gained legal standing through the Liahona Association that was registered with the government in 1993. In early 1995, two districts were organized in Romania. Seminary and church institute classes began in 1996. The Romanian translation of the Book of Mormon was released in December 1998 with assistance of native Romanians. By 2000, there were branches in Constanța, Piteşti, Ploieşti, Arad, Timişoara, Cluj-Napoca, Oradea, Sibiu, Bacău, Braşov, Galați, and Iaşi. The first two Church-owned meetinghouses were dedicated in May 2000 and were located in Bucharest and Ploiesti. Romania became part of the Europe Central Area in 2000. In early 2001, young Romanian Latter-day Saints gathered for a countrywide youth conference for the first time. The first young women camp was held in 2009. In early 2010, two missionaries died by natural gas asphyxiation in their apartment while sleeping. In 2010, only around six Romanian members had received their Patriarchal blessings, as there are no patriarchs in the country because no stakes were organized. In October 2018, Elder Quentin L. Cook visited Romania where he addressed the new home-centered, church supported gospel learning program. 

The LDS Church digitized the entire Romanian Census making it easier for family history.

Humanitarian Efforts
Starting in 1990 members in Europe quickly answered the call for aid and assistance to Romania’s disadvantaged by organizing teams of medical professionals composed of members from several nations. Needed supplies were also donated that were funded by member donations.

Starting on September 2, 1990, the Church started providing humanitarian support by sending missionaries. At the end of Nicolae Ceausescu's reign, about 25,000 children were warehoused in underfunded state-run orphanages. The missionaries worked in orphanages and institutions for the disabled. Included in this was organizing the Special Olympics, Romania's first, for disabled children in June 1991. In 1990, members in California sent quilts to needy orphanages in Romania. Assistance to orphanages continued in the 2000s, and there was an increase in specialized development projects. In 2000, members in Washington state sent bedding materials to an orphanage in Iasi, Romania. In 2003, the Church assisted the disabled by coordinating with members and local medical professionals fitting and allocating prosthetic devices. In 2010, the Church donated Braille writers to a school for blind children.

During the fall of the communist government, the University Library in Bucharest burned. In August 1991, Retired Brigham Young University professor George S. Barrus and Elder Russell M. Nelson of the Quorum of the Twelve encouraged a sponsoring of book drive for the library which collected over 40,000 books. This was the single largest book donation from the United States.

The Church offered humanitarian assistance following severe flooding along the Danube River in 2006. In 2014, Latter-day Saints participated in efforts with the Podul Dragostei Foundation to rebuild computers and donate computers to foster children in Romania. Romanian members reached out to others in service, especially as the number of refugees in Europe increased after 2015. By 2017, the Church had conducted a total of 300 humanitarian and development projects in Romania since 1985.

Districts and Congregations 

As of February 2023, Romania had the following districts and congregations:

Brașov Romania District
Arad Branch
Bacău Branch
Braşov Branch
Cluj-Napoca Branch
Constanta Branch
Craiova Branch
Galati Branch
Iaşi Branch
Mihai Bravu Branch
Oradea Branch
Panduri Branch
Piteşti Branch
Ploieşti Branch
Sibiu Branch
Timişoara Branch

Congregations in a district are called branches, regardless of size.

Missions

After the LDS Church gained official recognition in Romania in 1990, the country was part of the Austria Vienna East Mission. This mission was discontinued in 1992 and missionaries were then assigned to the Hungary Budapest Mission until July 1, 1993 when Romania Bucharest Mission was organized with John R. Morrey as president. This mission also administered church work in Moldova. On July 1, 2018 the mission was merged with the Hungary Budapest Mission and renamed the Hungary/Romania mission.

In November 2022, the church announced it will be dividing the mission in July 2023 with the recreation of the Romania Bucharest Mission. The mission in Hungary will be renamed to Hungary Budapest Mission

Temples
There are no temples in Romania. Romania is currently located within the Rome Italy the Freiberg Germany. and the Kyiv Ukraine Temple Districts. A closer temple, the Budapest Hungary Temple, was announced on April 7, 2019 by church president Russell M. Nelson.

See also

Religion in Romania

References

External links
 The Church of Jesus Christ of Latter-day Saints (Romania) - Official Site (Romanian)
 The Church of Jesus Christ of Latter-day Saints - Romania Newsroom (Romanian)
 ComeUntoChrist.org Latter-day Saints Visitor site

 
Christianity in Romania